Four ships of the Royal Navy have borne the name HMS Alecto, after Alecto, one of the Erinyes of Greek mythology:

  was a 12-gun fire ship launched in 1781 and sold in 1802.
  was a wood paddle sloop launched in 1839 and broken up in 1865.
  was a composite paddle vessel launched in 1882 and sold in 1899.
  was a depot ship launched in 1911 and sold in 1949.

Royal Navy ship names